Maksutov may refer to: 
 Maksutov telescope, a catadioptric telescope with a meniscus corrector .
 Dmitry Dmitrievich Maksutov (1896–1964), Russian optical engineer, inventor of the Maksutov telescope
 Maksutov (crater), a lunar crater named after Dmitry Dmitrievich Maksutov
 2568 Maksutov, a main-belt asteroid named after Dmitry Dmitrievich Maksutov

See also
 Maksutov (surname)